The 2002 College Football All-America Team is composed of the following All-American Teams: Associated Press (AP), Football Writers Association of America (FWAA), American Football Coaches Association (AFCA), Walter Camp Foundation (WCFF), The Sporting News (TSN), Pro Football Weekly (PFW), Sports Illustrated (CNNSI) and ESPN.

The College Football All-America Team is an honor given annually to the best American college football players at their respective positions. The original usage of the term All-America seems to have been to such a list selected by football pioneer Walter Camp in the 1890s. To be selected a consensus All-American, players must be chosen to the first team on at least two of the five official selectors as recognized by the NCAA. Second- and third-team honors are used to break ties. Players named first-team by all five selectors are deemed unanimous All-Americans. The NCAA officially recognizes All-Americans selected by the AP, AFCA, FWAA, TSN, and the WCFF to determine Consensus All-Americans.

Fourteen players were recognized as consensus All-Americans for 2002, 7 of them unanimously. Unanimous selections are followed by an asterisk (*)

Offense

Quarterback
Carson Palmer, Southern California (AP, FWAA, TSN, CNNSI, ESPN)
Ken Dorsey, Miami (Fla.) (AFCA, WCFF (tie))
Brad Banks, Iowa (WCFF (tie))
Byron Leftwich, Marshall  (PFW)

Running back
Larry Johnson, Penn State (AP, AFCA, FWAA, WCFF, TSN, PFW, CNNSI, ESPN)
Willis McGahee, Miami (Fla.) (AP, FWAA, WCFF, TSN, PFW, CNNSI, ESPN)
Chris Brown, Colorado (AFCA)

Wide receiver
Charles Rogers, Michigan State (AP, AFCA, FWAA, WCFF, TSN, PFW, CNNSI, ESPN)
Reggie Williams, Washington (AP, FWAA, ESPN)
Rashaun Woods, Oklahoma State (WCFF, TSN, CNNSI)
Nate Burleson, Nevada (AFCA)
Brandon Lloyd, Illinois (PFW)

Tight end
Dallas Clark, Iowa (AP, AFCA, FWAA, WCFF, TSN, CNNSI, ESPN)
Bennie Joppru, Michigan (PFW)

Offensive line
Shawn Andrews, Arkansas (AP, AFCA, FWAA, TSN, CNNSI, ESPN)
Jordan Gross, Utah (AP, FWAA, WCFF, PFW, CNNSI, ESPN)
Brett Romberg, Miami (Fla.) (AP, AFCA, FWAA, WCFF, CNNSI)
Eric Steinbach, Iowa (AP, AFCA, WCFF, TSN, PFW, ESPN)
Derrick Dockery, Texas (AP, FWAA, WCFF)
Brett Williams, Florida State (AFCA, TSN)
Derrick Roche, Washington State (AFCA)
Bruce Nelson, Iowa (FWAA, CNNSI)
Jeff Faine, Notre Dame (TSN, PFW, ESPN)
Wayne Lucier, Colorado (TSN)
Jon Stinchcomb, Georgia (WCFF)
Robert Gallery, Iowa (PFW)
Torrin Tucker, Southern Mississippi (PFW)
Vince Manuwai, Hawaii (CNNSI)
Todd Wike, Maryland (ESPN)

Defense

Ends
Terrell Suggs, Arizona State (WCFF, AP, FWAA, AFCA, TSN, PFW, CNNSI, ESPN)
David Pollack, Georgia (AP, FWAA, TSN, PFW, CNNSI, ESPN)
Calvin Pace, Wake Forest (AFCA)
Michael Haynes, Penn State (FWAA, CNNSI)
Cory Redding, Texas (WCFF)

Tackle
Tommie Harris, Oklahoma (AP, AFCA, WCFF)
Rien Long, Washington State (AP, FWAA, TSN, CNNSI, ESPN)
Jimmy Kennedy, Penn State (WCFF, TSN, PFW, ESPN)
Jerome McDougle, Miami (Fla.) (AFCA)
Dewayne Robertson, Kentucky (PFW)

Linebacker
Teddy Lehman, Oklahoma (AP, FWAA, WCFF, TSN, CNNSI, ESPN)
E.J. Henderson, Maryland (AP, AFCA, FWAA, WCFF, PFW, CNNSI, ESPN)
Matt Wilhelm, Ohio State (AP, FWAA, TSN, CNNSI)
Boss Bailey, Georgia (AFCA, WCFF)
Bradie James, LSU (TSN, AFCA)
Rod Davis, Southern Mississippi (PFW)
LaMarcus McDonald, TCU  (PFW)
Courtney Watson, Notre Dame  (ESPN)

Cornerback
Terence Newman, Kansas State (AP, AFCA, FWAA, WCFF, TSN, CNNSI, ESPN)
Shane Walton, Notre Dame (AP, AFCA, FWAA, WCFF, TSN, PFW, CNNSI)
Marlin Jackson, Michigan  (PFW)
Marcus Trufant, Washington State,(ESPN)

Safety
Mike Doss, Ohio State (AP, AFCA, FWAA, WCFF, TSN, PFW, CNNSI, ESPN)
Troy Polamalu, Southern California (AP, FWAA, WCFF, ESPN)
Brandon Everage, Oklahoma (AFCA, PFW)
Terrence Holt, North Carolina State (TSN)
Jim Leonhard, Wisconsin (CNNSI)

Special teams

Kicker
Mike Nugent, Ohio State (AFCA, WCFF, AP)
Nate Kaeding, Iowa (TSN, FWAA, PFW, CNNSI, ESPN)

Punter
Mark Mariscal, Colorado (AP, AFCA, WCFF, TSN, CNNSI, ESPN)
Andy Groom, Ohio State (FWAA)
Eddie Johnson, Idaho State (PFW)

All-purpose player / return specialist
Derek Abney, Kentucky (AP, FWAA, WCFF, TSN, CNNSI-KR, ESPN)
DeJuan Groce, Nebraska (AFCA, CNNSI-PR)

See also
 2002 All-ACC football team
 2002 All-Big 12 Conference football team
 2002 All-Big Ten Conference football team
 2002 All-Pac-12 Conference football team
 2002 All-SEC football team

References
Coaches' - AFCA
AP - Associated Press 
Writers - FWAA
TSN - The Sporting News
Walter Camp - Walter Camp
Pro Football Weekly, November 30, 2002.
SI - Sports Illustrated
ESPN - ESPN

All-America Team
College Football All-America Teams